Staffan Eklöf (born 1965 in Vaksala, Uppsala County) is a Swedish politician and member of the Riksdag for the Sweden Democrats.

Eklöf graduated with a PhD in cell and molecular biology from Umeå University and worked at the Swedish Board of Agriculture (SBA). He was elected to the Riksdag in 2018, taking seat 96 for the Halland County constituency. In parliament, he has been a member of the Environment and Agriculture Committee since 2021. He is also a municipal councilor for the Sweden Democrats in Jönköping. He has been a member of the Nordic Council since 2020.

References 

1965 births
Living people
Umeå University alumni
Members of the Riksdag 2018–2022
People from Jönköping
People from Halland County
Members of the Riksdag from the Sweden Democrats
Members of the Riksdag 2022–2026
21st-century Swedish politicians